The Incredible Jimmy Smith (subtitled Jimmy Smith at the Organ Vol. 3) is the third album by American jazz organist Jimmy Smith featuring performances recorded in 1956 and released on the Blue Note label. The album was rereleased on CD combined with Smith's previous two LP's A New Sound... A New Star... and A New Sound A New Star: Jimmy Smith at the Organ Volume 2.

Reception

The Allmusic review by Steve Leggett awarded the album 4 stars calling it:

Track listing
All compositions by Jimmy Smith except as indicated
 "Judo Mambo" – 5:31
 "Willow Weep for Me" (Ann Ronell) – 5:41
 "Lover, Come Back to Me" (Oscar Hammerstein II, Sigmund Romberg) – 6:42
 "Well, You Needn't" (Thelonious Monk) – 6:23
 "Fiddlin' the Minors" – 5:08
 "Autumn Leaves" (Joseph Kosma, Johnny Mercer, Jacques Prévert) – 4:43
 "I Cover the Waterfront" (Johnny Green, Edward Heyman) – 3:38

Bonus tracks on 2005 CD reissue
 "Jamey" – 6:00 
 "My Funny Valentine" (Lorenz Hart, Richard Rodgers) – 6:20 
 "I Can't Give You Anything But Love" (Dorothy Fields, Jimmy McHugh) – 4:48 
 "Slightly Monkish" – 5:27 
Recorded at Rudy Van Gelder Studio, Hackensack, New Jersey on June 17 (tracks 2, 6, 8 & 9) and June 18 (tracks 1, 3-5, 7, 10 & 11), 1956

Personnel

Musicians
 Jimmy Smith – organ
 Thornel Schwartz – guitar
 Donald Bailey – drums

Technical
 Alfred Lion – producer
 Rudy Van Gelder – engineer
 Reid Miles – cover design
 Francis Wolff – photography
 Leonard Feather – liner notes

References

Blue Note Records albums
Jimmy Smith (musician) albums
1956 albums
Albums produced by Alfred Lion
Albums recorded at Van Gelder Studio